Saponaria ocymoides, the rock soapwort or tumbling Ted, is a species of semi-evergreen perennial flowering plant belonging to the family Caryophyllaceae, native to south western and southern central Europe.

Etymology
The Latin specific epithet ocymoides means “resembling basil” (Ocimum). However the resemblance is superficial, as the two plants are not closely related. In fact Saponaria ocymoides belongs to the same family as pinks and carnations.

Description
The leaves are ovate to lanceolate, sessile and hairy, 1–3 cm long. The five-petalled flowers are arranged in groups at the ends of branches. They have red or pink (rarely white) petals and blue anthers. The sepals are  fused in a tube about an 8 to 10 millimeters long. The flowering period extends from May to August in the Northern Hemisphere. The fruit is an ovoid capsule, up to 9 mm long.

Distribution
This species ranges from the mountains of Spain to Corsica, Sardinia and Slovenia, from the Apennines to the Alps. It grows in rocky and stony places, dry slopes and forests (especially pine forests).

Cultivation
Saponaria ocymoides is cultivated as an ornamental plant for rock gardens and dry stone walls, in well-drained alkaline or neutral soil in full sun. Like most alpine plants it dislikes winter wetness around its roots. It has gained the Royal Horticultural Society's Award of Garden Merit.

Gallery

References

External links

 Biolib
 Saponaria ocymoides
 Gardening

Caryophyllaceae
Plants described in 1753
Taxa named by Carl Linnaeus